The Hapke parameters are a set of parameters for an empirical model that is commonly used to describe the directional reflectance properties of the airless regolith surfaces of bodies in the Solar System. The model has been developed by astronomer Bruce Hapke at the University of Pittsburgh.

The parameters are:

 — Single scattering albedo. This is the ratio of scattering efficiency to total light extinction (which includes also absorption), for small-particle scattering of light.
 — The width of the opposition surge. 
 or  — The strength of the opposition surge.
 or g — The particle phase function parameter, also called the asymmetry factor.
 — The effective surface tilt, also called the macroscopic roughness angle.

The Hapke parameters can be used to derive other albedo and scattering properties, such as the geometric albedo, the phase integral, and the Bond albedo.

See also
Albedo
Geometric albedo
Bidirectional reflectance distribution function

References

Radiometry
Scattering, absorption and radiative transfer (optics)